The white-tipped Oldfield mouse (Thomasomys caudivarius) is a species of rodent in the family Cricetidae. It is found in the Andes from central Ecuador to northern Peru, at elevations from 2500 to 3350 m, where it lives in montane forest.

References

Mammals of Ecuador
Mammals of Peru
Thomasomys
Mammals described in 1923